The 1997–98 Slovenian Second League season started on 16 August 1997 and ended on 7 June 1998. Each team played a total of 30 matches. Črnuče merged with Factor before the season.

League standing

Relegation play-offs

Rudar Trbovlje won 5–1 on aggregate.

Factor Črnuče won 7–5 on aggregate.

See also
1997–98 Slovenian PrvaLiga
1997–98 Slovenian Third League

References

External links
Football Association of Slovenia 

Slovenian Second League seasons
2
Slovenia